Ropica fouqueti is a species of beetle in the family Cerambycidae. It was described by Pic in 1938.

References

fouqueti
Beetles described in 1938